Corliss is a given name and a surname. 
The name Corliss is derived from Irish Gaelic, Corr Lios, meaning small round hill.
It may also refer to:
 Corliss, West Virginia, an unincorporated community
 Corliss Township, Minnesota
 Corliss, County Armagh, Northern Ireland, a townland
 Corliss High School, Chicago, Illinois
 Corliss Tunnel, Pittsburgh, Pennsylvania, a road tunnel
 Corliss, County Cavan, Ireland, a townland
 Sturtevant, Wisconsin, formerly named Corliss

See also
 Corliss steam engine